Helen Reilly (April 25, 1891 – January 11, 1962), was an American mystery writer known for a series of novels featuring Inspector Christopher McKee, head of the fictitious Manhattan Homicide Squad. She wrote mostly under her own name but also under the pseudonym Kieran Abbey. A member of the Mystery Writers of America, she served as its president in 1953.

Born Helen Kieran in New York City in 1891, she attended Hunter College, graduating in 1914. In that same year, she married Paul Reilly, an artist. Two of their four daughters, Ursula Curtiss and Mary McMullen, also became published mystery writers.

Reilly died on January 11, 1962, in Albuquerque, New Mexico. She was preceded in death by her husband in 1944.

Bibliography

Inspector McKee series

 The Diamond Feather (1930) 
 Murder in the Mews (1931) 
 The Line-Up (1934) 
 McKee of Centre Street (1934) 
 Mr. Smith's Hat: A Case for Inspector McKee (1936) 
 Dead Man Control (1936) 
 All Concerned Notified (1940) 
 Dead for a Ducat (1939) 
 The Dead Can Tell (1940) 
 Death Demands an Audience (1940) 
 Murder in Shinbone Alley (1940) 
 Mourned on Sunday (1941) 
 Three Women in Black (1941) 
 Name Your Poison (1942) 
 The Opening Door (1944) 
 Murder on Angler's Island (1945) 
 The Silver Leopard (1946) 
 The Farmhouse (1947) 
 Staircase 4 (1949) 
 Murder at Arroways (1950) 
 Lament for the Bride (1951) 
 The Double Man (1952) 
 The Velvet Hand (1953) 
 Tell Her It's Murder (1954) 
 Compartment K: Murder Rides a Canadian Transcontinental Express (1955) 
 The Canvas Dagger (1956) 
 Ding, Dong, Bell (1958) 
 Not Me, Inspector (1959) 
 Follow Me (1960) 
 Certain Sleep (1961) 
 The Day She Died (1962)

Other mysteries

 The Thirty-first Bullfinch (1930) 
 Man with the Painted Head (1931) 
 The Doll's Trunk Murder (1932) 
 File on Rufus Ray (1937) 

As Kieran Abbey
 Run with the Hare (1941) 
 And Let the Coffin Pass (1942) 
 Beyond the Dark (1944)

References

1891 births
1962 deaths
20th-century American women writers
Writers from New York City
American crime fiction writers
Hunter College alumni
Writers from Albuquerque, New Mexico